The 1983 President's Cup Football Tournament was the 13th competition of Korea Cup. It was held from 4 to 17 June 1983, and was won by a Dutch club PSV Eindhoven for the first time, who defeated South Korea in the final.

Group stage

Group A

Group B

Knockout stage

Bracket

Semi-finals

Third place play-off

Final

Controversies
In a group match of Thailand and United States, a South Korean referee who judged the match was criticized for awarding a controversial penalty to United States. Phisit, the Thai director and a vice-president of the Asian Football Confederation, seriously complained about it.

The Ghana national team tried to give up the third place play-off after they lost to South Korea in the semi-finals, where two of them were sent off with displeasure.

See also
Korea Cup
South Korea national football team results

References

External links
President's Cup 1983 (South Korea) at RSSSF

1983